The Bahamas Maritime Authority (BMA) is an authority that registers vessels in the Bahamas and enforces safety standards on Bahamian-registered craft. The authority has an office in the Shirlaw House in Nassau. It also has offices in the Bahamas House in New York City, in the Hutchinson House in Hong Kong, and in London.

The agency was established in July 1995. Prior to the establishment of the authority, the Bahamas Ministry of Transport maintained the register of ships that were Bahamian-flagged. The BMA was formed due to growth that made the prior arrangement difficult.

References

External links

 Bahamas Maritime Authority

1995 establishments in the Bahamas
Organisations based in the Bahamas
Maritime transport authorities
Ship registration
Organizations established in 1995